Jim Svoboda (born June 23, 1960) is an American football coach and former player. He is currently the offensive coordinator at Tulane University. Svoboda served as the head football coach at Nebraska Wesleyan University (NWU) from 1987 to 1993 and the University of Central Missouri in Warrensburg, Missouri from 2010 ro 2021. While at Nebraska Wesleyan, Svoboda won three Great Plains Athletic Conference championships (1988–1990), and advanced to the NAIA playoffs three times between 1988 and 1991. After coaching at NWU, Svoboda was the offensive coordinator at Northwest Missouri State University for 10 seasons, three of which the team won the NCAA Division II Football Championship. While serving as the offensive coordinator and quarterbacks coach at UCLA, Svoboda was a 2005 finalist for the Broyles Award, given annually to the nation's top college football assistant coach.

Head coaching record

References

External links
 Central Missouri profile

1960 births
Living people
American football running backs
Central Missouri Mules football coaches
Dana Vikings football coaches
Eastern New Mexico Greyhounds football coaches
Montana State Bobcats football coaches
Nebraska Wesleyan Prairie Wolves football coaches
Northwestern Red Raiders football coaches
Tulane Green Wave football coaches
UCLA Bruins football coaches
Sportspeople from Honolulu

American people of Czech descent
Players of American football from Honolulu